Sulci Gordii in the feature in the Tharsis quadrangle of Mars.  Sulci is a term used for subparallel furrows and ridges.  It is located at 18.9° north latitude and 125.5° west longitude.  It is 400 km long and was named after a classical albedo feature name.   The term "sulci" is applied to subparallel furrows and ridges.

References 

Tharsis quadrangle
Ridges on Mars